The 2016–17 Arizona Wildcats men's basketball team represented the University of Arizona during the 2016–17 NCAA Division I men's basketball season. The team was led by eighth-year head coach Sean Miller, and played their home games at McKale Center in Tucson, Arizona as members in the Pac-12 Conference. 
Coming into the '16-'17 season Arizona has been ranked in 78-consecutive AP polls & 81-straight coaches polls.  The 97-consecutive weeks in the AP poll is currently the second-longest streak in the nation behind Kansas at 161 weeks.  They have been ranked every week in the 2016-2017 season, bringing those totals to 97 weeks for the AP & 100 weeks for the coaches poll.  Arizona won its first 10 conference games, the best start since the '97-'98 season when they started 16-0. They finished the season with at record of 31–4, tied at 16–2 with Oregon in Pac-12 play for first place to win their 3rd Pac-12 regular season championship title for the 15th time. The Wildcats entered the Pac-12 Tournament as a 2-seed, the Wildcats defeated 7-seed Colorado in the quarterfinals, 3-seed UCLA in the semifinals and 1-seed Oregon (avenged from 85–58 loss on February 4 in Eugene, OR) in the championship game, Wildcats won their 2nd Pac-12 Tournament championship title for the 6th time since 2002. Arizona received as an automatic bid to the 5th straight NCAA tournament (34th NCAA tournament appearances) as a 2-seed in the West regional, The Arizona Wildcats defeated the 15-seed North Dakota 100–82 in the first round, 7-seed Saint Mary's 69–60 in the second round before being upset by 11-seed Xavier 71–73 in the Sweet Sixteen.

Due to 2017–18 NCAA Division I men's basketball corruption scandal, all wins from this season have been vacated.

Previous season

The Wildcats finished the 2015–16 season with a record of 25–9, 12–6 in Pac-12 play to finish in a tie with California for third place. The Wildcats entered the Pac-12 tournament as a 4 seed where they beat Colorado in the quarterfinals, but fell in the semifinals to Oregon in overtime. Arizona received an at-large bid to the NCAA tournament, the program's 33rd overall appearance, as a No. 6 seed in the South Region. They lost in the First Round to Wichita State.

Off-season

Incoming transfers

2016 recruiting class

Arizona's recruiting class has been ranked among the top 5 in the nation. However, due to eligibility concerns, five-star recruit Terrance Ferguson chose to play internationally and not attend Arizona.

Personnel

Roster

 

Aug 24, 2016 – Talbott Denny will miss the 2016–17 season after tearing his left ACL.
Nov 1, 2016 – Allonzo Trier suspended indefinitely for a test positive for PED. On Jan. 20, it was announced Trier would make his return for the UCLA game after 19 game absence.
Nov 1, 2016 – Sean Miller announced in a statement that Chance Comanche suspended indefinitely due to academic reasons. Suspension was lifted by season opener.
Nov 3, 2016 – Ray Smith tore his ACL in his right knee in the team's first exhibition game on November 1. Two days later, Smith announced on Twitter that he will end his basketball career.
Nov 30, 2016 – Parker Jackson-Cartwright suffered a high ankle sprain during game against Texas Southern. Made return for conference opener on December 30.

Depth chart
before Jan. 20

after Jan. 20

Coaching staff

Schedule and results
In Arizona's non-conference schedule the team hosted Cal State Bakersfield, Grand Canyon, New Mexico, Texas Southern, UC Irvine, Northern Colorado and Sacred Heart. Arizona had one true road game against Missouri. The Wildcats also played five games in four neutral sites. They played Michigan State in the Armed Forces Classic at Joint Base Pearl Harbor–Hickam in Honolulu, Hawaii (later announced that game was moved to Stan Sheriff Center to accommodate more fans), Gonzaga in the first ever HoopHall LA event at Staples Center in Los Angeles, California, Texas A&M at the Toyota Center in Houston, Texas, and also played at Orleans Arena as part in the Las Vegas Invitational in Las Vegas, where they face off against three of the following: Butler, Santa Clara or Vanderbilt.

In the unbalanced 18-game Pac-12 schedule, the team will face neither the Rocky Mountain teams (Colorado/Utah) on the road, nor the Oregon teams (Oregon/Oregon State) at home.

Arizona's pre-season Red-Blue scrimmage took place on October 14, 2016 at McKale Center. The Red team beat the Blue, 53–49.

|-
!colspan=12 style=| Exhibition

|-
!colspan=12 style=| Non-conference regular season

|-
!colspan=12 style=|  Pac-12 regular season

 

 

|-
!colspan=12 style=| Pac-12 Tournament

|-
!colspan=12 style=| NCAA tournament

Ranking movement

*AP does not release post-NCAA tournament rankings

Player statistics

Awards and honors

Preseason Award Watchlists
 Allonzo Trier
 Jerry West Award Watchlist (October 18, 2016) 
 Lauri Markkanen 
 Karl Malone Award Watchlist (October 20, 2016) 
Naismith Award Watchlist (November 10, 2016) 
 Wooden Award Watchlist (November 15, 2016)

Midseason Awards
Lauri Markkanen
Wooden Award Midseason Top 25 (January 12, 2017) 
 Wayman Tisdale Award  & Oscar Robertson Award Midseason watch list (January 23, 2017) 
 Karl Malone Award Finalist (February 2, 2017) 
 Naismith Trophy Top 30 (February 9, 2017)  
 Wooden Award Midseason Top 20 (January 12, 2017)

Season Awards
Sean Miller
 2017 Werner Ladder Naismith Men's College Coach of the Year semifinalist (March 3, 2017)
 Pac-12 Coach of the Year (March 7, 2017) 
Coach of the Year (Bleacher Report, Fox)
AP Pac-12 Coach of the Year (March 7, 2017) 
NABC District 20 Coach of the Year (March 22, 2017)
Lauri Markkanen
 2017 Wooden Award Top 15 Finalist (March 4, 2017)  
Allonzo Trier
 Pac-12 Tournament MOP (2017)

Weekly Awards
Lauri Markkanen
2x Pac-12 Player of the Week (January 20, 2017 – February 20, 2017)
 Oscar Robertson National Player of the Week (January 24, 2017) 
 Naismith Trophy National Player of the Week (February 20, 2017)
 Wayman Tisdale National Freshman Player of the Week (February 20, 2017)

All-Conference Pac-12 team
Lauri Markkanen
 All-Pac-12 Freshman team (2017)
 All-Pac-12 first team (2017)
 All-Pac-12 tournament team (2017)
 AP All-Pac-12 first team (2017)
Rawle Alkins
 All-Pac-12 freshman team (2017)
Kadeem Allen
 All-Pac-12 defensive team (2017)
 All-Pac-12 second team (2017)
Allonzo Trier
 All-Pac-12 second team (2017)

All-American teams
Lauri Markkanen
 2017 All-American 3rd team (AP, USA Today, SN, NBC, B1G Man)
 District IX All-District team (2017)
 NABC All-District First Team (District 20, March 22, 2017)

See also
2016–17 Arizona Wildcats women's basketball team

References

Arizona Wildcats men's basketball seasons
Arizona
2016 in sports in Arizona
2017 in sports in Arizona
Arizona
Pac-12 Conference men's basketball tournament championship seasons